"The language of poetry should be like brocade and the feeling deeper than the ocean." -from Michitoshi's Preface 

The , sometimes abbreviated as Goshūishū, is an imperial anthology of Japanese waka compiled in 1086 at the behest of Emperor Shirakawa (who had ordered it begun in 1075). It was compiled by the conservative Fujiwara no Michitoshi (1047-1099), who wrote its preface. It consists of twenty volumes containing 1,220 poems. It is noted for a comparatively large contingent of poems written by women.

Its name "Later Collection" comes from the fact that it succeeds the Shūi Wakashū ("Collection of Gleanings").

References 

 pg. 483 of Japanese Court Poetry, Earl Miner, Robert H. Brower. 1961, Stanford University Press, LCCN 61-10925
  pg 266; as quoted by Fujiwara no Shunzei in his Korai Fūteishō

Japanese poetry anthologies
1080s in Japan
1086
11th-century literature